, is a Japanese TV drama.

Synopsis
After being kidnapped and being taken to a cooking school told they must enroll, a group of boys deal with learning tons of recipes while also focusing on thoughts of love, friends, and intentions.

Cast
 Takahiro Nishijima as Rouma Kitasaka
 Hiroki Aiba as Rin Takasugi
 Ryosuke Miura as Matthew Perrier
 Takashi Nagayama as Tsukasa Okita
 Jin Shirosaki as Yoshinobu Tokudaira
 Shinjiro Atae as Shugo Katsuragi
 Hironari Amano as Ken Kodou
 Yuichi Nakamura as Ryuji Nango
 Ryunosuke Kawai as Toshiki Hijikata

External links
Official Site

Japanese drama television series